Sergei Aleksandrovich Svetlov  born January 17, 1961) is a Russian former professional ice hockey player who played in the Soviet Hockey League.  He played for HC Dynamo Moscow, Újpesti Dózsa and EC Ratingen. He was inducted into the Russian and Soviet Hockey Hall of Fame in 1988. From 2012 Head coach of KHL team Atlant (Moscow Region). He also competed in the men's tournament at the 1988 Winter Olympics.

Career statistics

Regular season and playoffs

International

References

External links
 
 Russian and Soviet Hockey Hall of Fame bio

1961 births
Dizel Penza players
HC Dynamo Moscow players
Living people
Ratingen EC players
Sportspeople from Penza
Soviet expatriate ice hockey players
Soviet ice hockey right wingers
Olympic medalists in ice hockey
New Jersey Devils draft picks
Újpesti TE (ice hockey) players
Olympic ice hockey players of the Soviet Union
Ice hockey players at the 1988 Winter Olympics
Soviet expatriate sportspeople in Hungary
Russian ice hockey right wingers